This article is about the particular significance of the year 1985 to Wales and its people.

Incumbents

Secretary of State for Wales – Nicholas Edwards
Archbishop of Wales – Derrick Childs, Bishop of Monmouth
Archdruid of the National Eisteddfod of Wales – Elerydd

Events
3 March – The UK miners' strike (1984–85) formally ends. Among the mines not reopening is Bedwas Navigation Colliery.
16 May – Dean Hancock and Russell Shankland are convicted of murder at Cardiff Crown Court and jailed for life. The previous November, at the height of the miners' strike, they had caused the death of a taxi driver by dropping a concrete block onto his car as it passed under a bridge.
29 June – The A55 Colwyn Bay bypass is completed.
4 July – At the Brecon and Radnor by-election (caused by the death of sitting Conservative MP Tom Ellis Hooson) local farmer Richard Livsey takes the seat for the Liberals.
20 December – Swansea City A.F.C., struggling in the English Third Division just three years after being in the First, are issued with a winding-up order in the High Court and are at risk of closure and being forced out of the Football League.
exact date unknown
Terry Matthews sells his stake in Mitel to British Telecom. 
"Cefn" is founded to campaign for the civil rights of Welsh speakers.
The Centre for Advanced Welsh and Celtic Studies is founded at the University of Wales, Aberystwyth.
Seventeen women are prosecuted on conspiracy charges after the occupation of a nuclear bunker near Carmarthen.

Arts and literature
Robat Powell becomes the first Welsh learner to win the Chair at the National Eisteddfod (see below).

Awards
National Eisteddfod of Wales (held in Rhyl)
National Eisteddfod of Wales: Chair - Robat Powell
National Eisteddfod of Wales: Crown - John Roderick Rees
National Eisteddfod of Wales: Prose Medal - Margaret Dafydd

New books

English language
Alice Thomas Ellis – Unexplained Laughter
Lady Olwen Carey Evans – Lloyd George Was My Father
David Hughes – The Pork Butcher
Christopher Meredith – This
Robert Minhinnick – The Dinosaur Park
John Powell Ward – The Clearing
Ivor Wilks – South Wales and the Rising of 1839

Welsh language
Geraint Bowen – Cerddi
Bryan Martin Davies – Lleoedd
Glanmor Williams 
Harri Tudur a Chymru
Grym Tafodau Tân
Eluned Phillips – Cerddi Glyn-y-Mêl

Music
Downtown Julie Brown makes her debut on Club MTV.
"Dwylo Dros y Môr", performed by various artists, is the Welsh charity song released in coordination with Band Aid.
Aled Jones – Aled Jones With The BBC Welsh Chorus (album)
Living Legends – Better Dead Than Wed

Film
Jonathan Pryce stars in Brazil.
Richard Marquand directs Jagged Edge.

Welsh-language films
None

Broadcasting

Welsh-language television
Helfa Drysor
Sam Tân (Fireman Sam)

English-language television
10 September – ITV broadcasts the Wales vs Scotland World Cup qualifying match live from Ninian Park in Cardiff. Scotland manager Jock Stein collapses and dies in the stadium's first aid room.

Sport
BBC Wales Sports Personality of the Year – Steve Jones
Horse racing – Hywel Davies wins the Grand National on "Last Suspect".

Births
2 January – Mark Evans, musical theatre actor, singer, dancer and choreographer
9 January – Elen Evans, rugby player 
23 February – Shaun Hopkins, rugby player
3 March – David Davies, swimmer 
8 April – Gareth Rees, cricketer
16 April – Mark Baker, historian and author
13 May
Iwan Rheon, screen actor
Danny Thomas, footballer
31 May – Laura Daniels, lawn bowler
16 June – Craig Morgan, footballer
17 July – Tom Cullen, actor
30 August – Richard Duffy, international footballer
11 September – Daniel Parslow, footballer
19 September – Alun Wyn Jones, international rugby union captain
24 September – Kimberley Nixon, actress
10 October – Marina Lambrini Diamandis, singer
14 December – Alex Pennie, musician
15 November – Simon Spender, footballer
25 December 
Leon Pisani, pop singer
Perdita Weeks, actress
28 December – Nicola Davies, footballer
date unknown – Claire Jones, harpist

Deaths
19 January – Tom Richards, athlete, 74
26 January – David Ormsby-Gore, 5th Baron Harlech, 66 (car accident) 
9 March – John Tudor Jones, journalist, poet, critic, broadcaster, and translator, 81
29 March – Rae Jenkins, violinist and conductor
4 April – Kate Roberts, author, 94
21 April – Owen Temple-Morris, barrister and politician, 88
22 April – Sir Thomas Parry, academic, 80
8 May – Tom Hooson, politician, 52 (cancer)
9 June – Clifford Evans, actor, 73
July - Roger Ashton (footballer), footballer, 63
1 September – Saunders Lewis, writer, 91
14 September – Niel Morgan, cricketer and diplomat, 81
17 September – Laura Ashley, designer, 60 (brain haemorrhage after fall)
18 September – Iorwerth Evans, rugby player, 79
28 October
Harold Davies, Baron Davies of Leek, politician, 81
Leslie Harris, cricketer, 70
4 November – Hilda Vaughan, novelist, 93
17 December –  Gwyn Richards, dual-code rugby player, 79
27 December – Len Richards, footballer, 74
date unknown – Dewi-Prys Thomas, architect

See also 

 1985 in England
 1985 in Northern Ireland
 1985 in Scotland

References 

 
Wales